Out Among the Stars is a posthumously released studio album by Johnny Cash. It was released on March 25, 2014, by Legacy Recordings. The recordings come from lost 1980s sessions with famed countrypolitan producer Billy Sherrill, which were shelved by Cash's record company, Columbia Records, and discovered by Cash's son John Carter Cash in 2012.

Background
The album is composed of recordings made by Cash in 1981 and 1984 with producer Billy Sherrill for Columbia Records. The album was shelved by the label and was never released. In 2012, Cash's son, John Carter Cash, discovered the recordings in the archive and commissioned additional production to complete the album. Cash also recorded the 1981 album The Baron with Sherrilll, in an attempt to turn around his dismal album sales, but the strategy did not work, leaving his record executives eager to end his affiliation with the label. The album is also a posthumous release for June Carter Cash, Johnny Cash's wife, who is featured on two tracks, and for Minnie Pearl and Waylon Jennings, who provide vocals on two other songs, "If I Told You Who It Was" and "I'm Movin' On", respectively.

Two of the tracks would later be rerecorded by Cash at American Recordings and would be released posthumously prior to earlier versions being included here; "I Came to Believe" appears on American V: A Hundred Highways, and a non-duet version of "I'm Movin' On" appears in the box set Unearthed.

In a March 2014 interview promoting the release of Out Among the Stars, John Carter Cash indicated that there may be as many as "four or five" albums worth of previously unreleased material from Cash's 1990s–2000s American label recording sessions, with Cash's last producer, Rick Rubin indicating at least one more such release is planned for the future.

Release and promotion
Lead single "She Used to Love Me a Lot" was released on January 14, 2014, on the Rolling Stone website. "I'm Movin' On", featuring Waylon Jennings, was released as the second single and was premiered by CMT on February 6, 2014. The third single, "Baby, Ride Easy", a duet with June Carter Cash (which the two had performed on TV on Johnny Cash's 1985 Christmas Special) was premiered exclusively by One Country on February 27, 2014. The album's title track, "Out Among the Stars", was released as the fourth and final single, with its lyric video premiering on May 7, 2014.

Critical reception

 Prior to its release, Stereogum named it one of the most anticipated albums of 2014.

Stephen Thomas Erlewine of AllMusic wrote that Billy Sherrill "winds up simply sweetening Johnny without changing his core sound". He added that the album "is generally chipper and bright" and "one of Cash's stronger '80s albums".

Rob Tannembaum's review in Rolling Stone mentions Cash's fading star power in the early 1980s amidst the "Urban Cowboy fad". Tannembaum continued: "You might expect Out Among the Stars – a set of unreleased songs he cut with Sherrill in 1981 and 1984 – to be a contract-fulfilling sleepwalk. (Cash put out several mostly mediocre LPs in those years, but left this material unfinished; it was discovered after his death.) Instead, it proves that even at his most uninterested, Cash couldn't help but make a record with weight, moral complexity, and grim humor."

Commercial performance
Released on March 25, 2014, Out Among the Stars debuted at #3 on the Billboard 200 and #1 on the Billboard Top Country Albums charts, selling 54,000 copies its first week. As of June 29, 2014, the album has sold 149,000 copies in the United States.

In the UK, the album debuted at #4 in the album chart. The album has sold 63,700 copies in the UK as of July 2014.

Track listing
"Out Among the Stars" (Adam Mitchell)  – 3:02
"Baby Ride Easy" (Richard Dobson)  – 2:43
"She Used to Love Me a Lot" (Kye Fleming, Dennis Morgan, Charles Quillen)  – 3:11
"After All" (Charles Cochran, Sandy Mason)  – 2:47
"I'm Movin' On" (Hank Snow)  – 3:09
"If I Told You Who It Was" (Bobby Braddock, Curly Putman)  – 3:05
"Call Your Mother" (Cash)  – 3:17
"I Drove Her Out of My Mind" (Gary Gentry, Hillman Hall)  – 3:01
"Tennessee" (Rick Scott)  – 3:27
"Rock and Roll Shoes" (Paul Kennerley, Graham Lyle)  – 2:41
"Don't You Think It's Come Our Time" (Tommy Collins)  – 2:17
"I Came to Believe" (Cash)  – 3:29
"She Used to Love Me a Lot" (JC/EC Version) (Kye Fleming, Dennis Morgan, Charles Quillen)  – 3:23
Tracks 1–8, 10, 12, recorded in 1984
Tracks 9, 11, recorded in 1981
Track 13 originally recorded in 1984, remixed in 2013

Personnel
Adapted from the liner notes.

Original session musicians
 Johnny Cash – vocals, guitar
 Pete Bordonali – guitar
 Jerry Carrigan – guitar
 June Carter Cash – duet on "Baby Ride Easy" and "Don't You Think It's Come Our Time"
 Pete Drake – steel guitar
 Jerry Kennedy – guitar
 Waylon Jennings – duet on "I'm Movin' On"
 Kenny Malone – drums
 Terry McMillan – harmonica
 Weldon Myrick – steel guitar
 Minnie Pearl – vocals on "If I Told You Who It Was"
 Hargus "Pig" Robbins – piano
 Billy Sanford – guitar
 Dale Sellers – guitar
 Henry Strzelecki – bass guitar
 Marty Stuart – guitar, mandolin
 John C. Williams – bass guitar
 Bobby Wood – piano
 Robert Wray – guitar

Additional musicians on 2013 sessions
 Niko Bolas – percussion
 Sam Bush – mandolin on "Don't You Think It's Come Our Time"
 Carlene Carter – background vocals on "Baby, Ride Easy"
 Laura Cash – fiddle
 Jerry Douglas – Dobro
 Mark Fain – upright bass on "Don't You Think It's Come Our Time"
 Tony Harrell – keyboards
 Rick Lonow – percussion
 Buddy Miller – guitar
 Pat McLaughlin – guitar
 Marty Stuart – guitar, mandolin
 Bryan Sutton – acoustic guitar and banjo on "Don't You Think It's Come Our Time"
 T. Blade – percussion

Additional backing vocals by the "Cash Cabin Vocal Group" and the full student body of Sumner Academy of Gallatin, Tennessee.

Technical personnel
 Steve Berkowitz – production (additional recording)
 Niko Bolas – mixing
 John Carter Cash – production (additional recording)
 Lou Robin – executive production
 Joseph M. Palmaccio – mastering
 Billy Sherrill – production (original sessions)
 Chuck Turner – engineering
 Nathan Yarborough – additional mixing

Chart positions
Album - Billboard (United States)

Weekly charts

Year-end charts

Certifications

See also

1981 in country music
1983 in country music
1984 in country music
The New Basement Tapes, a supergroup also featuring Costello who completed songs with Bob Dylan lyrics and released them as Lost on the River: The New Basement Tapes in 2014

References

External links
Trailer for the album from Vevo
Stream of "She Used to Love Me a Lot" from Rolling Stone

2014 albums
Albums produced by Billy Sherrill
Johnny Cash albums
Legacy Recordings albums
Albums published posthumously
Columbia Records albums
Albums produced by John Carter Cash